Niranjan Das Gulhati was an Indian civil engineer, water resources consultant and writer, known for his mediation in the Indus Waters Treaty of 1960 between India and Pakistan. His contributions were reported in the formation of the International Commission on Irrigation and Drainage (ICID), a non governmental organization which promotes transfer of water sharing technologies between countries. An Alumnus of the Thomason College of Engineering (present-day Indian Institute of Technology, Roorkee), he was associated with the World Bank, International Development Association and United Nations Economic and Social Commission for Asia and the Pacific. He was the author of two books, Indus Waters Treaty: An Exercise in International Mediation and Data Of High Dams In India. The Government of India awarded him the third highest civilian honour of the Padma Bhushan, in 1961, for his contributions to society. His life story has been documented in a book, The Untiring Indian - Lifestory of Mr. N. D. Gulhati - A Visionary Water Resources Engineer, published in 2011. The International Commission on Irrigation and Drainage has instituted an annual oration, N.D. Gulhati Memorial Lecture for International Cooperation in Irrigation and Drainage in his honor.

See also 
 Indus Waters Treaty
 International Commission on Irrigation and Drainage

References

External links

Further reading 
 

Recipients of the Padma Bhushan in civil service
1904 births
Year of death missing
Indian civil engineers
Water resource management in India
Indian technology writers
IIT Roorkee alumni
20th-century Indian engineers
20th-century Indian biographers